William Edmunds (Michele Giuseppe Pellegrino; September 18, 1886 – December 7, 1981) was an Italian-American stage and screen character actor, typically playing roles with heavy accents (generally Italian, Spanish, and French), most notable as Mr. Giuseppe Martini in It's a Wonderful Life.

Early life
Born the son of Donato Antonio Pellegrino and Maria Giovanna Ricigliano in San Fele, in the Italian region of Basilicata, he was christened Michele Frondino Pellegrino. He emigrated to the United States with his parents and siblings on the S/S Britannia, which sailed from Naples, Italy, and arrived at the Port of New York in April 1897. As an adult, he became an actor on the New York stage.

Career
He received his first credited role in motion pictures in the Bob Hope vehicle Going Spanish (1934).  He relocated to Hollywood in 1938 and had bit parts in films such as Idiot's Delight (1939), and larger roles such as House of Frankenstein (1944, as gypsy leader Fejos), Bob Hope's Where There's Life (1947, as King Hubertus II) and Double Dynamite (1951, as Groucho Marx's long-suffering boss). His many short subject appearances include a few stints as Robert "Mickey" Blake's father in the Our Gang series. He has a brief appearance in Casablanca (1942) where in Rick’s Café he gives instructions to a man seeking illegal passage out of Casablanca.

Edmunds was cast with James Stewart in three films, The Mortal Storm, The Shop Around the Corner (1940), and perhaps his signature role as Mr. Martini, the bar proprietor in It’s a Wonderful Life.  He had other notable parts in For Whom the Bell Tolls (1943), The Three Musketeers (1948), and The Caddy (1953), a Dean Martin and Jerry Lewis comedy. Edmunds received top billing in the 1951 TV situation comedy Actors' Hotel.

He acted on Broadway in such plays as The New York Story and Follies, which he left to be in It’s a Wonderful Life. Additional stage credits include Salt Water (1929–1930), Saluta (1934), Moon Over Mulberry Street (1935–1936), and Siege  (1937).

Death
Edmunds died in Los Angeles, California, at age 95. He was cremated and his ashes were scattered at sea.

Filmography

Going Spanish (1934 short) - Gaucho
Shadow of Doubt (1935) - Butler (uncredited)
Angels with Dirty Faces (1938) - Italian Storekeeper (uncredited)
Idiot's Delight (1939) - Dumptsy
Fixer Dugan (1939) - Smiley
Juarez (1939) - Italian Minister (scenes deleted)
Nurse Edith Cavell (1939) - Albert
The Rains Came (1939) - Mr. Das
Geronimo (1939) - Scout (uncredited)
Everything Happens at Night (1939) - Hotel Clerk
The Shop Around the Corner (1940) - Waiter (uncredited)
He Married His Wife (1940) - Waiter
Know Your Money (1940 short) - Samuel 'The Dutchman' Welker
Strange Cargo (1940) - Watchman (uncredited)
Earthbound (1940) - Chris (uncredited)
The Mortal Storm (1940) - Lehman
Anne of Windy Poplars (1940) - Train Conductor (uncredited)
The Great McGinty (1940) - Poll Watcher at Gymnasium (uncredited)
Stranger on the Third Floor (1940) - Gardener (uncredited)
Girl from Havana (1940) - Ricco, the bartender
Slightly Tempted (1940) - Quimby (uncredited)
Escape (1940) - White Swan Inn Waiter (uncredited)
The Mark of Zorro (1940) - Peón Selling Cocks (uncredited)
Girls Under 21 (1940) - Tony Mangione
Mr. & Mrs. Smith (1941) - Proprietor Lucy's
Baby Blues (1941 short) - Mr. Gubitosi (uncredited)
Knockout (1941) - Louis Grinnelli
Barnacle Bill (1941) - Joe Petillo
The People vs. Dr. Kildare (1941) - Sven Bergstrom (uncredited)
A Woman's Face (1941) - Courtroom Spectator (uncredited)
A Very Young Lady (1941) - Abner (uncredited)
They Met in Bombay (1941) - Hotel Barber (uncredited)
Man at Large (1941) - Otto Kisling
Unholy Partners (1941) - Pop - Night Watchman (uncredited)
Paris Calling (1941) - Prof. Marceau
The Wife Takes a Flyer (1942) - Gustav
Juke Girl (1942) - Travitti, Atlanta Produce Dealer (uncredited)
The Big Shot (1942) - Sarto
The Pied Piper (1942) - Frenchman
Crossroads (1942) - Driver (uncredited)
Berlin Correspondent (1942) - Hans Gruber
Casablanca (1942) - Second Contact Man at Rick's (uncredited)
The Black Swan (1942) - Town Crier (uncredited)
Reunion in France (1942) - Horse and Buggy Taxicab Driver (uncredited)
Assignment in Brittany (1943) - Plehec
Tonight We Raid Calais (1943) - Bell Ringer
Edge of Darkness (1943) - Elderly Sailor (uncredited)
Background to Danger (1943) - Waiter with Information (uncredited)
For Whom the Bell Tolls (1943) - Soldier #1 (uncredited)
Hostages (1943) - Hostage (uncredited)
Isle of Forgotten Sins (1943) - Noah - Native Chief
The Fallen Sparrow (1943) - Papa Lepetino (uncredited)
There's Something About a Soldier (1943) - Jan Grybinski (uncredited)
Madame Curie (1943) - Cart Driver (uncredited)
The Desert Song (1943) - Suliman (uncredited)
The Seventh Cross (1944) - Aldinger (uncredited)
Secrets of Scotland Yard (1944) - Isaiah Thom (uncredited)
Till We Meet Again (1944) - Henri Maret
The Conspirators (1944) - Blindman Vending Souvenirs (uncredited)
The Climax (1944) - Leon - theater concierge
One Body Too Many (1944) - Prof. Hilton (uncredited)
House of Frankenstein (1944) - Fejos
Dangerous Passage (1944) - Captain Saul
A Bell for Adano (1945) - Tomasino - Fisherman (uncredited)
This Love of Ours (1945) - Jose (uncredited)
The Well-Groomed Bride (1946) - Mr. Whortle (uncredited)
Anna and the King of Siam (1946) - Moonshee (uncredited)
Swamp Fire (1946) - Emile Ledoux
Nobody Lives Forever (1946) - Mission Priest (uncredited)
It's a Wonderful Life (1946) - Mr. Giuseppe Martini
The Beast with Five Fingers (1946) - Antonio
The Man I Love (1947) - Uncle Tony Toresca (uncredited)
Carnival in Costa Rica (1947) - Felipe (uncredited)
The Long Night (1947) - Man in Crowd (uncredited)
High Conquest (1947) - Train Conductor (uncredited)
That Hagen Girl (1947) - Corey - Butler / Chauffeur (uncredited)
The Lost Moment (1947) - Vittorio
Where There's Life (1947) - King Hubertus II
13 Lead Soldiers (1948) - Prager - Antique Dealer (uncredited)
The Pirate (1948) - Town Clerk (uncredited)
The Three Musketeers (1948) - Innkeeper-Landlord (uncredited)
The Big Sombrero (1949) - Don Luis Alvarado
A Kiss in the Dark (1949) - Kummel (uncredited)
Any Number Can Play (1949) - Men's Rom Attendant (uncredited)
Ringside (1949) - Prof. Berger
Mr. Soft Touch (1949) - Alex—Janitor (uncredited)
The Lawless (1950) - Mr. Jensen
Double Dynamite (1951) - Mr. Baganucci
Actors Hotel (1951 TV series) - Carlo Corelli
The Caddy (1953) - Caminello
The Walter Winchell File (1958 TV series) - Giovanni Mancuso
77 Sunset Strip (1959 TV series) - Papa Puccini (final appearance)

References

External links
 

1886 births
1981 deaths
Italian male film actors
Italian male stage actors
Italian emigrants to the United States
20th-century Italian male actors
People from the Province of Potenza